Zdeněk Lenhart (born 29 September 1948 in Brno) is an orienteering competitor who competed for Czechoslovakia. At the 1970 World Orienteering Championships in Eisenach he won a bronze medal in the relay, together with Bohuslav Beranek, Jaroslav Jasek and Svatoslav Galik. At the 1979 World Orienteering Championships in Tampere he again won a bronze medal in the relay, together with Petr Uher, Jiri Tichacek and Jaroslav Kacmarcik.

References

1948 births
Living people
Czech orienteers
Czechoslovak orienteers
Male orienteers
Foot orienteers
World Orienteering Championships medalists
Sportspeople from Brno